Galaxy is the seventh studio album by The Jeff Lorber Fusion it was released in January 2012.

Track listing

 "Live Wire"-4:03
 "Big Brother"-4:50
 "Montserrat-4:50
 "Galaxy"-5:17
 "City"-4:29
 "Horace"-5:34
 "The Samba"-4:49 (featuring Larry Koonse)
 "Rapids"-4:25
 "Wizard Island"-4:50
 "The Underground"-4:39 (featuring Randy Brecker)

References

2012 albums
Jeff Lorber albums